Mashkar (also Romanized as Māshkār) is a village in Shahi Rural District, Sardasht District, Dezful County, Khuzestan Province, Iran. At the 2006 census, its population was 94, in 15 families.

References 

Populated places in Dezful County